In Māori mythology, Kuramarotini was the daughter of Toto, a chief of Hawaiki. Toto made a gift to her of the canoe Matahourua, in which she went out fishing with her husband Hoturapa and their friend Kupe. Kupe tricked Hoturapa to dive into the water to free one of the lines. Once Hoturapa was overboard, Kupe set sail for New Zealand with Kuramarotini (Tregear 1891:186).

References
 Edward R. Tregear, Maori-Polynesian Comparative Dictionary (Lyon and Blair: Lambton Quay), 1891.

Māori mythology
Legendary Polynesian people
Women in mythology